Apocalypse is a third-person shooter video game released for the PlayStation, developed by Neversoft and published by Activision. It features actor Bruce Willis, who provides the main character's likeness and voice.

Plot
A brilliant evil scientist named "The Reverend" has created a powerful theocracy based on the idea of a rapidly approaching apocalypse. He uses his expertise to create four powerful "Horsemen of the Apocalypse", War, Plague, Beast and Death, in order to ensure this comes to pass. His former colleague, Trey Kincaid (voiced by Bruce Willis), is the only man with the know-how to stop the Reverend, but is locked up in jail and must escape in order to save the world.

Gameplay

Apocalypse is a 3D multidirectional shooter. The character is moved using the DualShock controller's left analog stick, and shooting is handled independently by pressing the right stick in a given direction, which automatically fires the current weapon in said direction. Alternately, movement may be controlled through the directional pad and shooting performed by using the four face buttons on a typical PlayStation controller (which lack analog sticks), where the buttons' placement on the controller correspond with the fire direction. Using the shoulder buttons it is also possible to duck or jump, and a selection of different weapons are available.

Development
The game engine for Apocalypse was completed in January 1996. Initially, the player character was a mercenary accompanied by an AI-controlled partner, Trey Kincaid, in an effort to create the video game equivalent of a buddy film. Activision later signed a multi-million-dollar deal for Bruce Willis to provide Trey Kincaid's voice and likeness, using "cyber-scanning" and motion capture. Trey Kincaid's role was eventually changed to that of the main playable character, thus reducing the necessity for him to have as much spoken dialogue as was originally intended as the scope of Bruce Willis' involvement decreased as development went on. In the finished game, Willis' vocal contributions are limited mostly to the occasional one-liner and a few brief lines of dialogue in story sequences. Willis' face was photo-mapped onto Trey Kincaid's character model. His motion capture performance was recorded at House of Moves, a film studio in Venice, CA. The sessions were held in mid-January 1997 and took two days. During voice recording, Willis made a number of suggestions of changes to the dialogue, which the developers agreed to.

Poe was cast as the character Plague using the same combination of cyber-scanning, motion capture, and voice recording as done with Willis. Apocalypse features several songs from various artists, including Poe and System of a Down. Technology developed for the game allowed live-action music videos from these artists to be projected on large screens within the game's environments.

A three-level "buddy AI" was developed for Kincaid, enabling Kincaid to take up aggressive or defensive approaches and attempt to get power-ups before the player character.

The game was demonstrated at the June 1997 Electronic Entertainment Expo, with Willis present to help promote it. At this time the AI-controlled partner mechanic was still in place, and the game was set to release in September, but the game had been delayed to a later release date of November 17, 1998.

The Apocalypse game engine was reworked for use on Neversoft's next title, the seminal Tony Hawk's Pro Skater. Already having in mind that they were going to begin work on Tony Hawk following completion of Apocalypse, the team said they had developed rough in-house playable demos of Trey Kincaid skateboarding around Apocalypses game environments in order to experiment with the way they wanted Tony Hawk to feel. Even though Neversoft continued to develop and evolve the engine primarily to suit the needs of the Tony Hawk series, it was also put to use in another action title by the team, the popular Spider-Man game they released in 2000. The aspect of the engine that allowed for the live-action music videos to be displayed within Apocalypses game world was also utilized in Tony Hawk's Pro Skater as well as other subsequent Neversoft titles.

Reception

The game received "average" reviews according to the review aggregation website GameRankings

Jeff Gerstmann of GameSpot praised the game's gameplay as a shooter while criticising the voice acting for lacking any feeling and variety. Next Generation called it "an action title that is average at best. There really is nothing new or innovative here. And in this fourth generation of PlayStation games, this is simply not acceptable". In Japan, where the game was ported and published by Success on September 22, 1999, Famitsu gave it a score of 22 out of 40.

References

External links
 

1998 video games
Activision games
Neversoft games
PlayStation (console) games
PlayStation (console)-only games
Success (company) games
Third-person shooters
Video games scored by Tommy Tallarico
Video games developed in the United States
Single-player video games